Rieppeleon brachyurus, known commonly as the zomba pygmy chameleon, is a species of chameleon, a lizard in the family Chamaeleonidae. The species is endemic to eastern and southeastern Africa.

Geographic range
R. brachyurus is found in Malawi, Mozambique, and southeastern Tanzania.

Reproduction
R. brachyurus is oviparous.

References

Further reading
Günther A (1893). "Report on a Collection of Reptiles and Batrachians transmitted by Mr. H. H. Johnston, C.B., from Nyassaland". Proc. Zool. Soc. London 1892: 555-558 + Plates XXXIII-XXXV. (Rhampholeon brachyurus, new species, p. 557 + Plate XXXIV, figures 2, 2a).
Matthee, Conrad A.; Tilbury, Colin R.; Townsend, Ted (2004). "A phylogenetic review of the African leaf chameleons: genus Rhampholeon (Chamaeleonidae): the role of vicariance and climate change in speciation". Proc. R. Soc. London B 271: 1967–1975. (Rieppeleon brachyurus, new combination).

Rieppeleon
Reptiles described in 1893
Taxa named by Albert Günther
Reptiles of Malawi
Reptiles of Tanzania
Reptiles of Mozambique